Rusty Stroupe is an American college baseball coach and former shortstop. Stroupe was the head coach of the Gardner–Webb Runnin' Bulldogs baseball team from 2003 to 2019.

Playing career
Stroupe played shortstop at Cherryville High School where he was part of three state championship teams, and earned a scholarship to play at Appalachian State University for the Mountaineers baseball program from 1983 to 1986.

Coaching career
After taking a teaching position after college graduation, Stroupe began to coach middle school baseball. In 1990, Stroupe was an assistant coach at Appalachian State. Stroupe took his first head coaching position at North Greenville College in 1991. In 1993, Stroupe became the head coach at Brevard College. From 1998 to 2002, Stroupe was the head coach at Lander University, where he started the baseball program.

In the summer of 2002, Stroupe to the head coaching position at Gardner–Webb. On April 17, 2019, Stroupe announced that he would be retiring at the end of the 2019 season. Stroupe is the all-time wins leader in Gardner-Webb baseball history.

Stroupe was named the Big South Conference Coach of the Year in 2019. 

In 2012, Stroupe received the prestigious FCA Jerry Kindall Character in Coaching Award (presented annually to the college or high school baseball coach in the United States who best exemplifies the Christian principles of Character, Integrity, Excellence, Teamwork and Service on and off the baseball field).

After retiring from coaching, Stroupe became a college professor, an ordained pastor, and a baseball color analyst for ESPN Plus.

Head coaching record at Gardner-Webb

References

External links
Gardner–Webb Runnin' Bulldogs bio

Living people
Baseball shortstops
Appalachian State Mountaineers baseball players
Appalachian State Mountaineers baseball coaches
North Greenville Crusaders baseball coaches
Brevard Tornados baseball coaches
Lander Bearcats baseball coaches
Gardner–Webb Runnin' Bulldogs baseball coaches
Year of birth missing (living people)